Golden Arrow is a 1949 British comedy film directed by Gordon Parry and starring Burgess Meredith, Jean-Pierre Aumont and Paula Valenska. It was shot at Teddington Studios. The film was eventually released as a second feature, despite a reasonably high budget and well-known cast. It was given an American release in 1953 by United Artists under the title The Gay Adventure. It takes its title from the Golden Arrow train service.

Plot
On a journey from Paris to London, a Briton, a Frenchman and an American bond with each other and indulge in a romantic fantasy about a girl they see.

Cast

 Burgess Meredith as Dick
 Jean-Pierre Aumont as Andre Marchand
 Paula Valenska as Suzy / Sonia / Hedy
 Kathleen Harrison as Isobel
 Richard Murdoch as David Felton
 Julian D'Albie as Waterhouse
 José de Almeyda as Jones
 Kenneth Kove as Clergyman
 Henry Pascal as Mazzini
 Glyn Lawson as Max
 Karel Stepanek as Schroeder
 Edward Lexy as The Colonel

Uncredited (in alphabetical order)
 Patrick Barr as Hedy's Husband
 Hilda Bayley as Mrs. Felton
 Derek Blomfield as 1st Officer in nightclub
 Gerald Case as 1st Military policeman
 Darcy Conyers as 2nd Officer in nightclub
 Sandra Dorne as 2nd Nightclub hostess
 Colin Gordon as Connelly
 Fred Griffiths as 2nd Military policeman
 Ernest Jay as Mr. Felton
 Richard Molinas as Schloss 
 Hugh Morton as Perdrelli
 Natasha Parry as Betty Felton
 Ivan Samson as Commanding Officer
 Milo Sperber as Black Marketeer
 Gordon Tanner as Bixby
 Ingeborg von Kusserow as 1st Nightclub hostess
 Richard Warner as Captain

References

Bibliography 
 Chibnall, Steve & McFarlane, Brian. The British 'B' Film. Palgrave MacMillan, 2009.

External links

1949 films
Films directed by Gordon Parry
1949 comedy films
British comedy films
Films with screenplays by Anatole de Grunwald
Films produced by Anatole de Grunwald
Films with screenplays by Sid Colin
Films shot at Teddington Studios
British black-and-white films
1940s English-language films
1940s British films